Flint S. "Scotty" Schulhofer (May 30, 1926 – December 14, 2006) was an American Hall of Fame Thoroughbred racehorse trainer.

Early life
Schulhofer was born into a racing family in Aiken, South Carolina, where his father owned a racing stable as well as a riding academy. While in his teens, he worked for trainer Oleg Dubassoff before  serving overseas with the United States Army infantry during World War II. At war's end, he studied for two years at The Citadel in Charleston, South Carolina. Enrolled in a premed program, he did not pursue his education further, preferring to return to the horse racing industry.

Training career
In 1962, Schulhofer saddled his first winner at Aqueduct Racetrack. He went on to win 1,328 races, including two Breeders' Cup races, and the Belmont Stakes Classic,  twice.

Retirement
Schulhofer retired from training in 2002 but remained active within the industry as a breeder. He was living in Hollywood, Florida at the time of his death on December 14, 2006. He is buried in Aiken, South Carolina.

His son, Randy Schulhofer, is also a Thoroughbred trainer.

Honors
Schulhofer was inducted into the National Museum of Racing and Hall of Fame in 1992.

References
 Scotty Schulhofer's biography at the NTRA
 Flint S. Schulhofer at the National Museum of Racing and Hall of Fame
 December 22, 2006 New York Times obituary for Scotty Schulhofer

1926 births
2006 deaths
United States Army personnel of World War II
American horse trainers
United States Thoroughbred Racing Hall of Fame inductees
Sportspeople from Aiken, South Carolina
United States Army soldiers
The Citadel, The Military College of South Carolina alumni